GM Components Holdings is an automotive components producer and distributor based in the United States.  It is a subsidiary of General Motors.  GMCH was created in 2009 as a result of the bankruptcy filings of both Delphi Corporation and General Motors.

GMCH consists of four facilities previously owned by Delphi:
 Harrison Thermal Systems, Lockport, New York — HVAC climate control systems, powertrain cooling systems
 Rochester Powertrain, Rochester, New York — engine management systems and related products
 Wyoming Powertrain Systems Grand Rapids, Wyoming, Michigan — valve train products
  Delco Electronics and Safety, Kokomo, Indiana — automotive electronics and related products

These plants manufacture components for GM and 20 other customers.

References 

Auto parts suppliers of the United States
Components
Manufacturing companies based in Michigan
Vehicle manufacturing companies established in 2009
2009 establishments in Michigan